The men's decathlon event was part of the track and field athletics programme at the 1924 Summer Olympics. It was the fourth appearance of a decathlon at the Olympics. The competition was held on Friday, 11 July, and Saturday, 12 July 1924. Thirty-six decathletes from 22 nations competed.

Results

100 meters
This event was held on 11 July 1924.

Long jump
This event was held on 11 July 1924.

Shot put
This event was held 11 July 1924.

High jump
This event was held 11 July 1924.

400 meters
This event was held 11 July 1924.

110 meter hurdles
This event was held 12 July 1924.

Discus throw
This event was held 12 July 1924.

Pole vault
This event was held 12 July 1924.

Javelin throw
This event was held 12 July 1924.

1500 meters
This event was held 12 July 1924.

Final standings

References

External links
Olympic Report
 

Men's decathlon
1924